Jeep Tshering Lama (alt. forename: Jip; alt. middle names: Tsering, Chiring, Chhiring) is a Nepali politician and a member of the House of Representatives of the federal parliament of Nepal. He was elected from Nepali Congress under the proportional representation system, filling the reserved seat for indigenous groups.

Social works
In 2018, he donated 5 ambulances to local governments in Dolakha district.

References

Living people
Nepal MPs 2017–2022
Nepali Congress politicians from Bagmati Province
Members of the 1st Nepalese Constituent Assembly
1955 births